Timothée Taufflieb (born 1 December 1992) is a French professional footballer who plays for Championnat National club Villefranche as a midfielder.

Professional career
Beginning his career with Paris Saint-Germain B, Taufflieb was called up to the senior team Paris Saint-Germain making his debut in a 6–0 Ligue 1 win over Caen on 16 April 2016. With his brief appearance, Taufflieb helped Paris win the 2015–16 Ligue 1 and earned himself a winner's trophy. Fearing limited first team opportunities, Taufflieb moved to Quevilly-Rouen and helped them get promoted to the Ligue 2 in 2017. In July 2019 he signed for FC Villefranche.

Honours
Paris Saint-Germain
Ligue 1: 2015–16

References

External links
 QRM Profile
 
 
 

Living people
1992 births
Sportspeople from Colombes
Footballers from Hauts-de-Seine
Association football midfielders
French footballers
Paris Saint-Germain F.C. players
US Quevilly-Rouen Métropole players
FC Villefranche Beaujolais players
Ligue 1 players
Ligue 2 players
Championnat National players
Championnat National 2 players
Championnat National 3 players